This is a list of lists of places in Wales.

National lists 

 List of built-up areas in Wales by population
 List of cities in Wales
 List of towns in Wales
Welsh placenames

Political 

List of communities in Wales
List of electoral wards in Wales

Lists of places within principal areas
List of places in Anglesey
List of places in Anglesey (categorised)
List of places in Blaenau Gwent
List of places in Bridgend County Borough
List of places in Caerphilly County Borough
List of places in Cardiff - for villages and districts see :Category:Populated places in Cardiff.
List of places in Carmarthenshire
List of places in Carmarthenshire (categorised)
List of places in Ceredigion
List of places in Conwy County Borough
List of places in Conwy County Borough (categorised)
List of places in Denbighshire
List of places in Denbighshire (categorised)
List of places in Flintshire
List of places in Flintshire (categorised)
List of places in Gwynedd
List of places in Gwynedd (categorised)
List of places in Merthyr Tydfil County Borough
List of places in Monmouthshire
List of places in Neath Port Talbot
List of places in Neath Port Talbot (categorised)
List of places in Newport
List of places in Pembrokeshire
List of places in Pembrokeshire (categorised)
List of places in Powys
List of places in Powys (categorised)
List of places in Rhondda Cynon Taf
List of places in Rhondda Cynon Taf (categorised)
List of places in Swansea
List of places in Swansea (categorised)
List of places in Torfaen
List of places in the Vale of Glamorgan
List of places in Wrexham County Borough

See also
British toponymy
Toponymical list of counties of the United Kingdom
List of generic forms in British place names
Subdivisions of the United Kingdom
List of cities in the United Kingdom
List of United Kingdom locations

 

Wales geography-related lists
Lists of location lists